Bandreddi Sukumar (born 23 January 1970) is an Indian film director, screenwriter, and producer who works in Telugu cinema. He is known for his complex, crisp, and multi-layered screenplays and for infusing grey shades in the characterisation of his protagonists. He is one of the highest paid directors in South Indian cinema.

Sukumar worked as a mathematics and physics lecturer at a junior college in Kakinada for nearly seven years before pursuing a directional career in films. He began working as a writer and worked with Editor Mohan before assisting V. V. Vinayak on Dil (2003). Sukumar made his directorial debut with Arya in 2004, whose success catapulted him to stardom. Sukumar won the Filmfare Award for Best Director – Telugu and Nandi Award for Best Screenplay Writer for his work on Arya.

His other notable acclaimed films include Arya 2 (2009), 100% Love (2011), 1: Nenokkadine (2014), Nannaku Prematho (2016), Rangasthalam (2018), and Pushpa: The Rise (2021). Rangasthalam was the third highest grossing Telugu film at the time behind the Baahubali duology. Pushpa: The Rise is the highest-grossing Indian film of 2021, and ranks among the highest-grossing Telugu films of all time.

Sukumar made his debut as a film producer under the banner Sukumar Writings with Kumari 21F (2015), whose story and screenplay were penned by him. In 2014, he received the K. V. Reddy Memorial award for his contributions to Telugu cinema.

Early life and family 
Sukumar was born on 11 January 1970, in Mattaparru, a village near Malikipuram in East Godavari district of Andhra Pradesh. His father Tirupathi Rao Naidu was a rice trader and his mother Veera Veni was a homemaker. Sukumar was the youngest of the six children of Naidu and Veni. At the age of 6, following the slaughter of a rooster he loved, Sukumar practiced vegetarianism for a long time.

He did his schooling from Zilla Parishad High School, Razole and graduated with a master's degree in mathematics. He later worked as a mathematics and physics lecturer in Aditya Junior college, Kakinada. After nearly seven years, Sukumar and his junior Prakash Toleti decided to do something creative as they opined that their life has become too mundane as a lecturer.

Career 
Sukumar and Toleti began their career as writers in Telugu cinema and worked as writers for a few films. After writing three scenes for Jayanth C. Paranjee Bavagaru Bagunnara? (1998), they were summoned by the college to help them in recruiting students. They walked out of the film on moral grounds. Due to lack of earnings, Sukumar briefly continued to teach students, earned money, and returned back to film industry. He worked as an assistant director for Manasichi Choodu (1998). Sukumar later assisted Editor Mohan for Kshemamga Velli Labhamga Randi (2000) and Hanuman Junction (2001). Before making his directorial debut, Sukumar worked under V. V. Vinayak for Dil (2003) as an assistant director.

Debut and breakthrough: 2004–2011 
Sukumar began working on the script of his directorial debut Arya (2004) in Visakhapatnam before joining the sets of Vinayak's Dil. Its producer Dil Raju assured that he would produce the film if Dil becomes a commercial success. Sukumar chose to narrate the story of a boy who confess his love to a girl right in the beginning, opposed to films like Darr (1993), Kabhie Haan Kabhie Naa (1994), and Kaadhal Kondein (2003) where the protagonist's love/obsession for the female lead is revealed towards the end, as he found that idea an "obsolete" one. Raju was impressed with Sukumar's script and Allu Arjun was selected as its protagonist after considering Ravi Teja, Nithin, and Prabhas. Anuradha Mehta and Siva Balaji were chosen for the other two lead roles. R. Rathnavelu and Devi Sri Prasad were chosen as the film's director of photography and music director respectively; they both collaborated with Sukumar in many of his future projects. Arya was commercially successful; it grossed 16 crore on a budget of 4 crore. The success of Arya catapulted Sukumar into stardom overnight. He earned the Filmfare Award for Best Director – Telugu at the 52nd Filmfare Awards South ceremony, and the Best Screenplay Writer award at the annual Nandi Awards ceremony.

Sukumar then began working on the script of Jagadam (2007), a crime film starring Ram Pothineni and Isha Sahni. Unlike Arya, Jagadam focused more on violence and in an interview with South Scope, Sukumar called the film an "act of bravado", adding that he "made it with an innocent passion", without thinking about the audience's response. Jagadam received mixed reviews and was a commercial failure. While Sify called the film a "not so much a plot-driven film" albeit praising the work of its technical crew, Rediff called it a "good effort". He then wrote and directed Arya 2 (2009), which was promoted as the namesake sequel of his debut Arya. It featured Allu Arjun, Kajal Aggarwal, and Navdeep in the lead roles and narrated the story of Arya, a psychotic orphan whose love for his friend Ajay and his colleague Geetha is never reciprocated. The film received mixed reviews from critics. However, Arya 2 became one of the few successful Telugu films of the year, and was praised for its style quotient and music. Sukumar received a nomination for the Filmfare Award for Best Director – Telugu at the 57th Filmfare Awards South ceremony, but lost it to S. S. Rajamouli for Magadheera. Rajamouli stated that he regards Sukumar as the best of the lot after watching Arya 2, which according to Sukumar "was the most precious and sweetest thing I have heard about myself".

After a gap of two years, Sukumar's next directorial film 100% Love (2011) was released. Sukumar envisioned the film's concept 15 years ago, which dealt with the simple conflicts couples face and the way they solve them, and made changes based on the technological and behavioural developments of the students in the colleges. 100% Love featured Naga Chaitanya and Tamannaah in the lead roles and was produced by Allu Aravind and Bunny Vasu. 100% Love was commercially successful; it received the Best Home-viewing Feature Film award at the annual Nandi Awards ceremony. Sukumar earned another nomination for the Filmfare Award for Best Director – Telugu at the 59th Filmfare Awards South, and a nomination for the Best Director – Telugu at the 1st South Indian International Movie Awards.

Darker themes: 2014–present 

After completing 100% Love, Sukumar began working on 1: Nenokkadine, a psychological thriller keeping Mahesh Babu in mind as the protagonist as he felt that Mahesh had a universal appeal in terms of looks. The incident of a bus driver talking about a young boy who claims that his parents were murdered in that bus was taken as the story's base. He worked on the film's script for two months, and considered it as his dream project. 1: Nenokkadine was released on 10 January 2014 globally and received mixed reviews from the critics. While Suresh Kavirayani of Deccan Chronicle opined that Sukumar "fails to deliver" and the story is "run of the mill", Sangeetha Devi Dundoo of The Hindu stated, "Habitual to watching films that begin with a great premise only to fall into the commercial trap of force-fit comic situations, it comes as a relief when Sukumar laces the psychological thriller with subtle wit that never takes the focus away from the plot". 1: Nenokkadine collected approximately 28.9 crore share worldwide on a budget of 6070 crore, thus becoming a commercial failure. In 2014, he wrote and directed a 2.5 minute short film I Am That Change produced by and starring Allu Arjun. Upon its release, the short film received viral response online and was acclaimed by many including celebrities for its concept and execution.

Following the demise of his father Tirupathi Naidu, Sukumar decided to direct Nannaku Prematho starring N. T. Rama Rao Jr. and Rakul Preet Singh in the lead roles. Nannaku Prematho, which was Rama Rao Jr.'s 25th film as an actor, dealt with an emotional relationship between a father and his son spanning the last 30 days of the father's life. Released on 13 January 2016, Nannaku Prematho received positive reviews from the critics. Pranita Jonnalagedda of The Times of India stated that the viewers see ups every time when Sukumar "decides to listen to his inner self and gives us some interestingly conceived sequences" and downs come whenever he "gives in to the prerequisite mandates of Telugu cinema". An above average grosser at the domestic box office, Nannaku Prematho became the third highest grossing Telugu film of all time in the overseas market. His 2018 period action film with Ram Charan titled Rangasthalam received positive critical feedback with particular praise for Ram Charan's performance, and Sukumar's direction and screenplay. Rangasthalam ended up as one of the highest-grossing Telugu films of all time.

Post the success of Rangasthalam, Sukumar started working on the period action drama, Pushpa: The Rise, starring Allu Arjun and Rashmika. Budgeted between 170200 crores, it was released as a pan-Indian film and went on to get amazing commercial reception in Telugu, Hindi, and Tamil languages to earn more than 350 crores by the end of its run. Post the pan-Indian success of Pushpa: The Rise, Sukumar announced that the sequel, Pushpa 2: The Rule, would commence production from summer 2022. In 2020 September, Sukumar announced that he would be collaborating with Vijay Devarakonda after completing the Pushpa duology. In 2022 February, he announced his collaboration with Chiranjeevi, which will commence post the completion of his film with Vijay Devarakonda.

Personal life 
Sukumar had a relationship with Thabitha, whom he met first at the Sudarshan Theatre, RTC X Roads, Hyderabad during the screening of his directorial debut Arya (2004). They married in 2009 in the presence of his parents and sister. Though Thabitha's parents opposed Sukumar for being a film technician, they accepted their alliance later. The couple have a daughter and a son.

Craft, style, and technical collaborations 
As a writer, Sukumar is influenced by the works of Gudipati Venkatachalam, Yandamuri Veerendranath, and Yaddanapudi Sulochana Rani. In an interview with Deccan Chronicle, he revealed that each of the romantic scenes in his films are inspired from the writings of either Veerendranath or Sulochana Rani. Sukumar mentioned that Martin Scorsese has had a huge influence on him. He uses non-linear screenplay for most of his films and few sequences of most of his films involve revelation of finest details and re-visiting a scene again and again. His screenplays are mostly complex and multi-layered which earned him the reputation of being an intelligent screenplay writer. In an interview of The Times of India in January 2014, Sukumar said that emotions play a key role in his films, stating that a film "may have multiple subplots, but in the end, it's the emotional curve that connects with the audience". Because of improvising the sequences on the sets and making changes to already filmed portions, his films took long time to complete their production phases.

In most of his films, Sukumar's protagonists are shown to be characterised with grey shades. Y. Sunita Chowdary of The Hindu commented that Sukumar "revels in giving a slight twist to his protagonist, in his background and character" and leaves the audience to understand him as he "unties the knots during narration and justifies his behaviour and makes us root for him". Karthik Keramalu of CNN-IBN, in his review of Kumari 21F, stated that Sukumar's lead characters are "psychologically wired differently", adding that at least one of the characters in his films "behaves in a way that will amuse the audience and the other characters present in the film". Regarding the same, Sukumar said, "We all have a lot of emotions and we suppress most of them fearing rejection. Instead we sport a smile and move on in this world. Problems arise when we don’t enjoy all feelings like jealousy, selfishness and don’t express them. To achieve something, there must be a driving force and that could be jealousy which you term as negative".

Except for the short film I Am That Change whose music was composed by Sai Karthik, Sukumar chose Devi Sri Prasad to compose the soundtrack and background score for all the films he directed. Sukumar worked with cinematographer R. Rathnavelu for Arya, Jagadam, and 1: Nenokkadine. When Raju asked Sukumar about the budget to be allotted to Arya, Sukumar said that he first wants Rathnavelu on board. In an interview to The Hindu in March 2012, Rathnavelu said, "Sukumar's speciality is he can give you five different ways to solve every problem you encounter. He can get to the crux of the problem and figure out the best possible method to resolve it". Because of their friendship with Sukumar, neither Rathnavelu nor Prasad charged any remuneration for his maiden production venture Kumari 21F. He worked with Venkat R. Prasad, Vijay C Chakravarthy, and Mirosław Kuba Brożek for films 100% Love, Nannaku Prematho, and Pushpa: The Rise respectively.

Film production
Sukumar Writings or (SW) is the production company of Sukumar. Sukumar Writings' first venture was Kumari 21F, which had Devi Sri Prasad as the music composer and R. Rathnavelu as the director of cinematography. Ashok Banreddi and Thomas Reddy joined as co-producers with P.A. Motion pictures. The film was co-produced by Vijaya Prasad Bandreddi and Thomas Reddy.

Sukumar provided the story and screenplay for Kumari 21F, his debut feature film as a co-producer which was directed by his assistant Palnati Surya Pratap. He took inspiration from his college days in Razole where a young woman went to a picnic with some young men; a major undertaking for a woman at the time. Rumours were spread and the woman was labelled as a "loose" character, which stayed in Sukumar's mind. Produced on a budget of 615 crore, Kumari 21F grossed 38 crore and became the 12th highest grossing Telugu film of the year. Siddharth Rao of The Times of India stated, "In an industry where a damsel-in-distress-wooed-and-saved-by-an-angry-young-man is the norm, this is refreshing. Kudos to the writer Sukumar for giving yet another off-beat story with characters that can't be put into a box".

Filmography 
Sukumar has directed eight feature films so far.

Other roles

Awards and nominations

Notes

References

Bibliography

External links 
 

Living people
21st-century Indian film directors
Telugu film directors
Indian male screenwriters
Filmfare Awards South winners
Nandi Award winners
1970 births
Film directors from Andhra Pradesh
People from East Godavari district
Screenwriters from Andhra Pradesh
21st-century Indian dramatists and playwrights
Telugu screenwriters
21st-century Indian male writers
21st-century Indian screenwriters
Santosham Film Awards winners
CineMAA Awards winners